The 1996 Alabama Crimson Tide football team represented the University of Alabama for the 1996–97 college football season, competing in the Western Division in the Southeastern Conference. Gene Stallings led the Crimson Tide to a 10–3 record in his final year with the program. The team played their home games at Bryant–Denny Stadium in Tuscaloosa, Alabama, and Legion Field in Birmingham, Alabama.

Alabama's loss to Mississippi State broke a 15-game winning streak Alabama had in the series and was their first loss to the Bulldogs since a dramatic upset MSU posted over the #1 ranked Tide in 1980.

Following a victory in the annual Iron Bowl on November 23, head coach Gene Stallings announced his retirement, which would go into effect at the end of the season.

Schedule

Coaching staff

Game summaries

Bowling Green

Alabama wins its sixth straight season opener over newly Division 1 opponent Bowling Green.

Southern Miss

Alabama would hold Southern Miss to 104 yards of offense to win for the sixth straight year over the Golden Eagles.

Vanderbilt

In the first home game at Bryant-Denny Stadium for 1996, a shootout would unfold as the Crimson Tide would use a 21 point 3rd quarter to beat the Commodores.

Arkansas

A defensive struggle goes the Crimson Tide way as they avenge their loss of a year ago to Arkansas.

Kentucky

Former Alabama coach Bill Curry returned to Tuscaloosa for the first time since leaving Alabama for Kentucky in 1989. Despite being heavy underdogs, Curry's Wildcats forced a 7-7 tie at halftime which brought a chorus of boos from the homecoming crowd. The Crimson Tide then would use a 28 point third quarter to beat Kentucky.

North Carolina State 

Despite giving up a season high 418 yards of offense, The Crimson Tide survived on the road to stay undefeated.

Ole Miss

The Crimson Tide put its most complete game together to date in 1996 to roll to a shutout win of Ole Miss.

Tennessee

Tennessee used 14 unanswered points in the 4th quarter to beat Alabama for the second year in a row and for the first time in Knoxville since 1984.

LSU

For the second time in three weeks, Alabama defense would shut out its opponent. The Crimson tide offense went through one man Redshirt Freshman Shaun Alexander rushed for a School record 291 yards and all four Alabama touchdowns.

Mississippi State

For the first time since 1980, Alabama would lose to Mississippi State in one of the biggest upset of the Gene Stallings era.

Auburn

After the game, head coach Gene Stallings announced his resignation effective at the end of the season.

Florida

Alabama would be in its fourth SEC Championship game in five seasons and once again would face Florida, as they had the previous three meetings. The Gators would use nearly 500 yards of offense to win its fourth straight SEC title, a record that still holds to this day.

Michigan

Two 4th quarter touchdowns proved to be enough as Alabama would win its 10th game of the season and the 70th and final for Gene Stallings as head coach.

References

Alabama
Alabama Crimson Tide football seasons
ReliaQuest Bowl champion seasons
Alabama Crimson Tide football